Drive, She Said is a 1997 Canadian film by Mina Shum, starring Moira Kelly, Sebastian Spence and Josh Hamilton.

Plot summary

Nadine (Moira Kelly), a bank teller, is taken hostage by Tass (Josh Hamilton), who has robbed the bank to pay for medical care for his ailing mother. The film focuses on the developing relationship between Nadine and Tass, and Nadine's changing views in relation to her conventional life and relationships. The police and Nadine's longtime boyfriend, fellow bank employee Jonathan (Sebastian Spence) search for and successfully find her, though also find that she has been permanently affected by her time with Tass.

Critical reception

The film was Shum's second film, after her well-received 1994 film, Double Happiness, which starred Sandra Oh. Drive, She Said received mixed reviews.  Writing in Variety, Derek Elley described the film as "a meet-cute road movie that starts in high gear but soon takes too many left turns for its own good. Mina Shum’s second feature, after her well-remarked, Chinese-themed low-budgeter 'Double Happiness' is too mild a confection to motor on to much theatrical business."

Release History
The film, produced by Stephen Hegyes had a limited release. It premiered at the Toronto International Film Festival in 1997, where audience reaction was positive, but did not generate firm distribution interest.    It was then shown at the Popcorn Festival in Sweden, in 1998.  Also in 1998, the film was invited to the competition section of the Delle Donne International Film Festival, in Turin, Italy.

Cast
Moira Kelly  ... Nadine Ship  
Sebastian Spence  ... Jonathan Evans  
Josh Hamilton  ... Tass Richards  
Jim Byrnes  ... Dr. Glen Green  
 Lori Ann Triolo  ... Jo (as Lori Triolo)  
Peter Stebbings  ... Detective Eddie  
 David Hurtubise  ... Ben Polstein  
 Hiromoto Ida  ... Sloan  
Mina Shum  ... Chen  
 John B. Destry  ... Bob The Guard (as John Destry)  
 Hrothgar Mathews ... Ernie  
 Carrie Cain-Sparks  ... The Waitress (as Carrie Cain Sparks)  
 Mike Crestejo  ... Bike Cop  
 Amanda Leary  ... Bank Heistess  
 Allan Franz  ... Medic  
 Tom Scholte  ... Arnold The Gas Guy  
 Tom Shorthouse  ... Kindly Older Gent  
 Tong Lung  ... Counter Person  
 Alex Diakun  ... The Prophecy  
 Carla Stewart  ... Mrs. Richards  
 Harry Kalinski  ... Merlin The Driver (as Harry Kalensky)  
 Micki Maunsell  ... Cranky Lady

References

External links

Canadian drama films
English-language Canadian films
1997 films
Films directed by Mina Shum
Films shot in British Columbia
1990s English-language films
1990s Canadian films